Giuseppe Statella (born 15 March 1988) is an Italian professional footballer who plays as a midfielder.

Club career
On 5 October 2020 he joined Vibonese.

On 26 July 2021, he moved to Lavello in Serie D.

On 31 January 2022, Statella returned to Serie C and signed with ACR Messina.

On 25 August 2022, Statella signed with freshly-promoted Serie C club Gelbison. His contract with Gelbison was terminated by mutual consent on 27 January 2023.

References

External links
 
 tuttomercatoweb.com

1988 births
Living people
Sportspeople from the Metropolitan City of Reggio Calabria
Footballers from Calabria
Italian footballers
Italy youth international footballers
Association football midfielders
Serie B players
Serie C players
Serie D players
S.S.C. Bari players
Benevento Calcio players
U.S. Salernitana 1919 players
Torino F.C. players
F.C. Grosseto S.S.D. players
S.S. Fidelis Andria 1928 players
F.C. Pavia players
F.C. Pro Vercelli 1892 players
Cosenza Calcio players
Ternana Calcio players
U.S. Catanzaro 1929 players
U.S. Vibonese Calcio players
A.C.R. Messina players